The Gabinete de Urbanização Colonial (1944-1974) of Portugal was a government office responsible for urban planning in Portuguese colonies in Africa and Asia. It began operating in 1945. In 1951 it became the Gabinete de Urbanização do Ultramar, and in 1957 the Direcção de Serviços de Urbanismo e Habitação of the Overseas Ministry public works department. Staff included Joao A. de Aguiar, Rogerio Cavaca, and Pinto Coelho.

See also
 Urban planning in Africa: Portuguese colonies
 Portuguese colonies in Africa (20th c.):
 Portuguese Congo
 Portuguese Guinea
 Portuguese Mozambique
 Portuguese São Tomé and Príncipe

References

Bibliography

External links
  (Press release for an exhibit curated by Ana Vaz Milheiro)

Portuguese Empire
1944 establishments in Portugal
1974 disestablishments in Portugal
Urban planning
Government ministries of Portugal
Defunct organisations based in Portugal